The Mumbai–Hyderabad High Speed Rail Corridor is a planned high-speed rail line connecting India's economic hub Mumbai with the city of Hyderabad. When completed, it will be one of key links in India's high-speed rail line network along with Mumbai-Ahmedabad line.

Set to be the third high-speed rail line project of India involving Mumbai, this project will cut short the travel time between the two cities from existing 15-hour-journey to a mere 3 and a half hour journey. The terminal for this corridor may be built in Navi Mumbai, which is planned to be integrated with the currently under-construction international airport. Besides the airport, it will be linked with Navi Mumbai's metro and the connectivity is further set to expand with a connection to the Mumbai Trans Harbour Link, work on which is underway.

Stations
Planned stations - Navi Mumbai, Lonavla, Pune, Daund, Akluj, Pandharpur, Solapur, Kalaburagi, Zaheerabad and Hyderabad.

See also
 Hyderabad–Bengaluru high-speed rail corridor
 Chennai-Bengaluru-Mysuru high-speed rail corridor
 Mumbai–Ahmedabad high-speed rail corridor
 Mumbai–Nagpur high-speed rail corridor

References
https://www.thehindubusinessline.com/news/hyd-mumbai-high-speed-rail-track-dpr-to-be-ready-in-6-months/article37561446.ece/amp/

External links
 Preliminary Study 

High-speed railway lines in India
Standard gauge railways in India
Rail transport in Maharashtra
Rail transport in Andhra Pradesh
Proposed railway lines in India
Modi administration initiatives
Rail transport in Mumbai
Transport in Andhra Pradesh
India–Japan relations
2020 in rail transport
Transport in Hyderabad, India